In a Savage Land is a 1999 Australian film set in New Guinea just prior to and during World War II. It won the 2000 ARIA Music Award for Best Original Soundtrack.

Story 
The film opens in pre-1938 Adelaide, where Phillip Spence (Donovan) is lecturing a graduate class in anthropology. He hopes to enlarge on the work of Malinowski with a multi-year field study of a Trobriand Island community, whose matrilineal culture encourages pre-marital sex. He needs his star student Evelyn, who has a gift for languages, to accompany him and asks her to marry him — despite his gauche approach she acquiesces. They hear on the radio of the declaration of war with Germany.

They reach the island, where traders exchange trinkets (a mouth organ for instance) for pearls. They are introduced to Mick Carpenter (Sewell), a free-diver who goes pearl hunting with the natives. He predicts she will not stay a year; she wagers her father's watch against one of his pearls to the contrary.
Phillip has an argument with the traders, who are profiting from the natives' poor bargaining position; the trader questions whether he expects an academic promotion on the back of his research and how much he is paying his subjects.
Evelyn picks a fight with the Rev. MacGregor (John Howard), who is urging them to abandon their funeral rituals for burial in the Christian cemetery, and wants the women to cover their breasts. She becomes proficient at the language, and in conversation with the women learns of their conception myth: because recreational sex is a way of life they do not see pregnancy as an occasional outcome.

She has an argument with her husband; he deprecates her ambitions as a researcher on the grounds of his academic credentials and her inferior status as a female student. He refuses her permission to use the camera, as she "might break it". And he tells her to stop talking to the women, being a departure from accepted research methodology.
She does take the camera, and captures a couple copulating in a hidden grotto; she returns the camera to her furious husband; "see I didn't break it" she pouts. But the photograph is stolen and creates a crisis — it turns out the girl was promised to a prominent tribesman; now he doesn't want her. The girl leaps to her death from a tall coconut tree; the traditional form of suicide. Evelyn is distraught, seeing herself as a impediment to her husband's work, and pays Carpenter to take her to a neighbouring island to conduct her own research among the island's inhabitants, a belligerent patriarchal tribe who show her no respect once Carpenter has left. Her husband has an unhappy time with her gone: he is assaulted by the woman, humiliated and ostracized. Evelyn is called back as he is dying from dysentery. She buries him native fashion; she removes her clothing and goes through the widow's ritual: her head is shaved, she is blackened all over with mud and shuts herself in a cage, preparing to starve herself to death. Carpenter brings her water and tries to feed and exercise her. Weeks pass and she leaves the cage; Carpenter nurses her back to health and they fall in love.

They hear on the radio of the attack on Pearl Harbor and are warned of imminent Japanese encroachment. Japanese bombers shower them with leaflets, then a small party of Japanese soldiers lands, and the Europeans follow the pre-arranged moonlight evacuation. Carpenter makes as if to leave, then doubles back to remain as a coast watcher — executed as a spy if caught.

It is around 1950. Evelyn had made a pilgrimage to the island, retrieved her notebooks, and asked after Carpenter, but heard only rumors of his death. Her book In a Savage Land is published, and at a book signing someone slips a package onto the table. It contains Carpenter's perfect pearl — she rushes out and eventually finds him, one leg missing but alive. The film ends with a flashback to the idyllic moment when he told her of the legend that a gold-lipped oyster predicted a lasting relationship.

Concept and production 
The idea behind the film originated in some photographs Bennett found in a trunk left by his father, who was an Australian war photographer in the area in the 1940s. He read the work of Bronislaw Malinowski in the Trobriand Islands and imagined his protagonists building on her work. The story was written by Bennett and his wife Jennifer; Dr Wojciech Dabrowski advised on anthropological aspects of the story and Neil McDonald and Hank Nelson of ANU helped with historical research.

Bennett decided to shoot the film on location on the Trobriands, using hundreds of locals as extras, which lent it near-documentary authenticity but at great expense. With a budget of around $10 million, it was in 1999 the most expensive Australian film to date.

The film was shot over six weeks in Papua New Guinea and two weeks in Adelaide.

References

External links

In a Savage Land at Australian Screen Online
In a Savage Land at Oz Movies
In a Savage Land at Urban Cinefile

1999 films
1990s adventure films
ARIA Award-winning albums
Australian adventure drama films
Films set in Papua New Guinea
Films shot in Papua New Guinea
Films shot in Adelaide
Films directed by Bill Bennett
1990s English-language films